Andreas Hougaard Boesen (born 1991) is an international Danish orienteer. He won his first medal at the 2017 World Orienteering Championships in Tartu, Estonia, running in the Mixed Sprint Relay with Maja Alm, Tue Lassen and Cecilie Friberg Klysner. Boesen runs for OK Roskilde and Angelniemen Ankkuri.

References

External links

1991 births
Living people
Danish orienteers
Male orienteers
Foot orienteers
World Orienteering Championships medalists
Competitors at the 2017 World Games
Junior World Orienteering Championships medalists